The history of Bangladesh (1971–present) refers to the period after the independence of Bangladesh from Pakistan.

1972–80: Post-independence era

Sheikh Mujibur Rahman administration

Upon his release on 10 January 1972, Sheikh Mujibur Rahman briefly assumed the provisional presidency and later took office as the prime minister, heading all organs of government and decision-making. The politicians elected in 1970 formed the provisional parliament of the new state.
The Mukti Bahini and other militias amalgamated to form a new Bangladeshi army to which Indian forces transferred control on 17 March. The government faced serious challenges, which including the rehabilitation of millions of people displaced in 1971, organising the supply of food, health aids and other necessities. The effects of the 1970 cyclone had not worn off, and the state's economy had immensely deteriorated by the conflict.

Mujib helped Bangladesh enter into the United Nations and the Non-Aligned Movement. He travelled to the United States, the United Kingdom and other European nations to obtain humanitarian and developmental assistance for the nation. He signed a treaty of friendship with India, which pledged extensive economic and humanitarian assistance and began training Bangladesh's security forces and government personnel. Mujib forged a close friendship with Indira Gandhi, strongly praising India's decision to intercede, and professed admiration and friendship for India.
Major efforts were launched to rehabilitate an estimated 10 million refugees. The economy began recovering and a famine was prevented.
A constitution was proclaimed in 1972 and elections were held, which resulted in Mujib and his party gaining power with an absolute majority. He further outlined state programmes to expand primary education, sanitation, food, healthcare, water and electric supply across the country. A five-year plan released in 1973 focused state investments into agriculture, rural infrastructure and cottage industries.

In 1974, Bangladesh experienced the deadliest famine ever, which killed around 1.5 million Bangladeshi people from hunger.

Left wing insurgency
At the height of Sheikh Mujib's power, left wing insurgents, organised by Jatiyo Samajtantrik Dal's armed wing Gonobahini fought against the government of Sheikh Mujibur Rahman, to establish a Marxist government.

The government responded by forming the Jatiya Rakkhi Bahini which began a campaign of brutal human rights abuses against the general populace, including the force became involved in numerous charges of human rights abuse including political killings, shooting by death squads, and rape. Members of Jatiyo Rakkhi Bahini were granted immunity from prosecution and other legal proceedings.

Bangladesh Krishak Sramik Awami League (BAKSAL)
According to Abdur Razzaq, the 1974 famine profoundly affected Mujib's views on governance, while political unrest gave rise to increasing violence. During the famine, 70,000 people were reported as dead (Note: Reports vary). In response, he began increasing his powers. On 25 January 1975 Mujib declared a state of emergency and his political supporters approved a constitutional amendment banning all opposition political parties. Mujib assumed the presidency and was given extraordinary powers. His political supporters amalgamated to form the only legalised political party, the Bangladesh Krishak Sramik Awami League, commonly known by its initials—BAKSAL. The party identified itself with the rural masses, farmers and labourers and took control of government machinery. It also launched major socialist programmes. Using government forces and a militia of supporters called the Jatiyo Rakkhi Bahini, Mujib clamped down on any opposition to him. The militia known as RakhiBahini and police were accused of torturing suspects and political killings. While retaining support from many segments of the population, Mujib evoked anger amongst veterans of the liberation war for what was seen as a betrayal of the causes of democracy and civil rights.

Assassination of Sheikh Mujibur Rahman and aftermath
On 15 August 1975, a group of junior army officers invaded the presidential residence with tanks and killed Mujib, his family and personal staff. Only his daughters Sheikh Hasina Wajed and Sheikh Rehana, who were visiting West Germany, escaped. They were banned from returning to Bangladesh. The coup was planned by disgruntled Awami League colleagues and military officers, which included Mujib's colleague and former confidanté Khondaker Mostaq Ahmad, who became his immediate successor. There was intense speculation in the media accusing the US Central Intelligence Agency of having instigated the plot. Lawrence Lifschultz has alleged that the CIA was involved in the coup and assassination, basing his assumption on the then US ambassador in Dhaka Eugene Booster.

Mujib's death plunged the nation into many years of political turmoil. The coup leaders were soon overthrown and a series of counter-coups and political assassinations paralysed the country. Order was largely restored after a coup in 1977 gave control to the army chief Ziaur Rahman. Declaring himself President in 1978, Ziaur Rahman signed the Indemnity Ordinance, giving immunity from prosecution to the men who plotted Mujib's assassination and overthrow.

Military-Civil regime under Ziaur Rahman, 1975–81

Successive military coups resulted in the emergence of Army Chief of Staff General Ziaur Rahman ("Zia") as strongman. He pledged the army's support to the civilian government headed by President Chief Justice Sayem. Acting at Zia's behest, Sayem dissolved Parliament, promising fresh elections in 1977, and instituted martial law.

Acting behind the scenes of the Martial Law Administration (MLA), Zia sought to invigorate government policy and administration. While continuing the ban on political parties, he sought to revitalise the demoralised bureaucracy, to begin new economic development programs, and to emphasise family planning. In November 1976, Zia became Chief Martial Law Administrator (CMLA) and assumed the presidency upon Sayem's retirement five months later, promising national elections in 1978.

As President, Zia announced a 19-point program of economic reform and began dismantling the MLA. Keeping his promise to hold elections, Zia won a five-year term in June 1978 elections, with 76% of the vote. In November 1978, his government removed the remaining restrictions on political party activities in time for parliamentary elections in February 1979. These elections, which were contested by more than 30 parties, marked the culmination of Zia's transformation of Bangladesh's Government from the MLA to a democratically elected, constitutional one. The AL and the Bangladesh Nationalist Party (BNP), founded by Zia, emerged as the two major parties.

In May 1981, Zia was assassinated in Chittagong by dissident elements of the military. The attempted coup never spread beyond that city, and the major conspirators were either taken into custody or killed. In accordance with the constitution, Vice-President Justice Abdul Sattar was sworn in as acting president. He declared a new national emergency and called for election of a new president within six months—an election Sattar won as the BNP's candidate. President Sattar sought to follow the policies of his predecessor and retained essentially the same cabinet, but the army stepped in once again.

1980s

The dictatorship of Hussain Muhammad Ershad, 1982–90

Army Chief of Staff Lieutenant General Hussain Muhammad Ershad assumed power in a bloodless coup on 24 March 1982, citing the "grave political, economic, and societal crisis" that the nation was in. This move was not unanticipated, as Ershad had previously expressed distaste with the ageing Sattar (who was past his 75th birthday) and his handling of national affairs, in addition to his refusal to allow the army more participation in politics. Like his predecessors, Ershad suspended the constitution and—citing pervasive corruption, ineffectual government, and economic mismanagement—declared martial law. Among his first actions were to privatise the largely state-owned economy (up to 70% of industry was in public ownership) and encourage private investment in heavy industries along with light manufacturing, raw materials, and newspapers. Foreign companies were invited to invest in Bangladeshi industry as well, and stiff protectionist measures were put in place to safeguard manufacturing. All political parties and trade unions were banned for the time being, with the death penalty to be administered for corruption and political agitation. Ershad's takeover was generally viewed as a positive development, as Bangladesh was in a state of serious economic difficulty. Two weeks before the coup in March, Prime Minister Shah Azizur Rahman announced that the country was facing significant food shortages. The government also faced a severe budget deficit to the tune of 4 billion takas, and the IMF declared that it would not provide any more loans until Bangladesh paid down some of its existing debts. The following year, Ershad assumed the presidency, retaining his positions as army chief and CMLA. During most of 1984, Ershad sought the opposition parties' participation in local elections under martial law. The opposition's refusal to participate, however, forced Ershad to abandon these plans. Ershad sought public support for his regime in a national referendum on his leadership in March 1985. He won overwhelmingly, although turnout was small. Two months later, Ershad held elections for local council chairmen. Pro-government candidates won a majority of the posts, setting in motion the President's ambitious decentralisation program. Political life was further liberalised in early 1986, and additional political rights, including the right to hold large public rallies, were restored. At the same time, the Jatiya (National) Party, designed as Ershad's political vehicle for the transition from martial law, was established.

Despite a boycott by the BNP, led by President Zia's widow, Begum Khaleda Zia, parliamentary elections were held on schedule in May 1986. The Jatiya Party won a modest majority of the 300 elected seats in the National Assembly. The participation of the Awami League—led by the late President Mujib's daughter, Sheikh Hasina Wajed—lent the elections some credibility, despite widespread charges of voting irregularities.

Ershad resigned as Army Chief of Staff and retired from military service in preparation for the presidential elections, scheduled for October. Protesting that martial law was still in effect, both the BNP and the AL refused to put up opposing candidates. Ershad easily outdistanced the remaining candidates, taking 84% of the vote. Although Ershad's government claimed a turnout of more than 50%, opposition leaders, and much of the foreign press, estimated a far lower percentage and alleged voting irregularities.

Ershad continued his stated commitment to lift martial law. In November 1986, his government mustered the necessary two-thirds majority in the National Assembly to amend the constitution and confirm the previous actions of the martial law regime. The President then lifted martial law, and the opposition parties took their elected seats in the National Assembly.

In July 1987, however, after the government hastily pushed through a controversial legislative bill to include military representation on local administrative councils, the opposition walked out of Parliament. Passage of the bill helped spark an opposition movement that quickly gathered momentum, uniting Bangladesh's opposition parties for the first time. The government began to arrest scores of opposition activists under the country's Special Powers Act of 1974. Despite these arrests, opposition parties continued to organise protest marches and nationwide strikes. After declaring a state of emergency, Ershad dissolved Parliament and scheduled fresh elections for March 1988.

All major opposition parties refused government overtures to participate in these polls, maintaining that the government was incapable of holding free and fair elections. Despite the opposition boycott, the government proceeded. The ruling Jatiya Party won 251 of the 300 seats. The Parliament, while still regarded by the opposition as an illegitimate body, held its sessions as scheduled, and passed numerous bills, including, in June 1988, a controversial constitutional amendment making Islam Bangladesh's state religion and provision for setting up High Court benches in major cities outside of Dhaka. While Islam remains the state religion, the provision for decentralising the High Court division has been struck down by the Supreme Court.

By 1989, the domestic political situation in the country seemed to have quieted. The local council elections were generally considered by international observers to have been less violent and more free and fair than previous elections. However, opposition to Ershad's rule began to regain momentum, escalating by the end of 1990 in frequent general strikes, increased campus protests, public rallies, and a general disintegration of law and order.

Devolution and Local government Act
To improve rural administration, Ershad introduced the Upazila and Zila Parishad system. He held the 'first democratic elections for these village councils' in 1985.

1990s

Transition to democracy
A wide umbrella of political parties united against Ershad. Ziaur Rahman's widow, Khaleda Zia, led the Bangladesh Nationalist Party, which allied with the Bangladesh Awami League, led by Sheikh Mujibur Rahman's daughter Sheikh Hasina. Jamaat-e-Islami Bangladesh and other Islamic parties and alliances joined the opposition ranks. They called for strikes and protests that paralysed the state and its economy. Although the parliament was dissolved, fresh elections were boycotted by the opposition, including Awami League and Jamaat. Students launched an intensifying opposition campaign, which ultimately forced Ershad to step down.
On 6 December 1990, Ershad offered his resignation. On 27 February 1991, after two months of widespread civil unrest, an interim government headed by Acting President Chief Justice Shahabuddin Ahmed oversaw what most observers believed to be the nation's most free and fair elections to that date.

First Khaleda administration, 1991–96

The centre-right Bangladesh Nationalist Party won a plurality of seats and formed a government with support from the Islamic party Jamaat-I-Islami, with Khaleda Zia, widow of Ziaur Rahman, obtaining the post of prime minister. Only four parties had more than 10 members elected to the 1991 Parliament: The BNP, led by Prime Minister Begum Khaleda Zia; the AL, led by Sheikh Hasina; the Jamaat-I-Islami (JI), led by Ghulam Azam; and the Jatiya Party (JP), led by acting chairman Mizanur Rahman Choudhury while its founder, former President Ershad, served out a prison sentence on corruption charges. The electorate approved still more changes to the constitution, formally re-creating a parliamentary system and returning governing power to the office of the prime minister, as in Bangladesh's original 1972 constitution. In October 1991, members of Parliament elected a new head of state, President Abdur Rahman Biswas.

In March 1994, controversy over a parliamentary by-election, which the opposition claimed the government had rigged, led to an indefinite boycott of Parliament by the entire opposition. The opposition also began a program of repeated general strikes to press its demand that Khaleda Zia's government resign and a caretaker government supervise a general election. Efforts to mediate the dispute, under the auspices of the Commonwealth Secretariat, failed. After another attempt at a negotiated settlement failed narrowly in late December 1994, the opposition resigned en masse from Parliament. The opposition then continued a campaign of marches, demonstrations, and strikes in an effort to force the government to resign. The opposition, including the Bangladesh Awami League, led by Sheikh Hasina, pledged to boycott national elections scheduled for 15 February 1996.

In February, Khaleda Zia was re-elected by a landslide in voting boycotted and denounced as unfair by the three main opposition parties. In March 1996, following escalating political turmoil, the sitting Parliament enacted a constitutional amendment to allow a neutral caretaker government to assume power and conduct new parliamentary elections; former Chief Justice Muhammad Habibur Rahman was named Chief Adviser (a position equivalent to Prime Minister) in the interim government. New parliamentary elections were held in June 1996 and the Awami League won plurality and formed the government with support from the Jatiya Party led by deposed president Hussain Muhammad Ershad; party leader Sheikh Hasina became Prime Minister of Bangladesh.

First Hasina administration, 1996–2001

Sheikh Hasina formed what she called a "Government of National Consensus" in June 1996, which included one minister from the Jatiya Party and another from the Jatiya Samajtantrik Dal. The Jatiya Party never entered into a formal coalition arrangement, and party president Hussain Muhammad Ershad withdrew his support from the government in September 1997. Only three parties had more than 10 members elected to the 1996 Parliament: the Awami League, BNP, and Jatiya Party. Jatiya Party president, Ershad, was released from prison on bail in January 1997.

International and domestic election observers found the June 1996 election free and fair, and ultimately, the Bangladesh Nationalist Party decided to join the new Parliament. The BNP soon charged that police and Bangladesh Awami League activists were engaged in large-scale harassment and jailing of opposition activists. At the end of 1996, the Bangladesh Nationalist Party staged a parliamentary walkout over this and other grievances but returned in January 1997 under a four-point agreement with the ruling party. The Bangladesh Nationalist Party asserted that this agreement was never implemented and later staged another walkout in August 1997. The Bangladesh Nationalist Party returned to Parliament under another agreement in March 1998.

In June 1999, the Bangladesh Nationalist Party and other opposition parties again began to abstain from attending Parliament. Opposition parties staged an increasing number of nationwide general strikes, rising from six days of general strikes in 1997 to 27 days in 1999. A four-party opposition alliance formed at the beginning of 1999 announced that it would boycott parliamentary by-elections and local government elections unless the government took steps demanded by the opposition to ensure electoral fairness. The government did not take these steps, and the opposition subsequently boycotted all elections, including municipal council elections in February 1999, several parliamentary by-elections, and the Chittagong city corporation elections in January 2000.

In July 2001, the Bangladesh Awami League government stepped down to allow a caretaker government to preside over parliamentary elections. Political violence that had increased during the Bangladesh Awami League government's tenure continued to increase through the summer in the run up to the election. In August, Khaleda Zia and Sheikh Hasina agreed during a visit of former President Jimmy Carter to respect the results of the election, join Parliament win or lose, forswear the use of hartals (violently enforced strikes) as political tools, and if successful in forming a government allow for a more meaningful role for the opposition in Parliament. The caretaker government was successful in containing the violence, which allowed a parliamentary general election to be successfully held on 1 October 2001.

2000s

Second Khaleda administration, 2001–2006
The Four Party Alliance led by the Bangladesh Nationalist Party won over a two-thirds majority in Parliament. Begum Khaleda Zia was sworn in on 10 October 2001, as Prime Minister for the third time (first in 1991, second after the 15 February 1996 elections).

Despite her August 2001 pledge and all election monitoring groups declaring the election free and fair, Sheikh Hasina condemned the election, rejected the results, and boycotted Parliament. In 2002, however, she led her party legislators back to Parliament, but the Bangladesh Awami League again walked out in June 2003 to protest derogatory remarks about Hasina by a State Minister and the allegedly partisan role of the Parliamentary Speaker. In June 2004, the AL returned to Parliament without having any of their demands met. They then attended Parliament irregularly before announcing a boycott of the entire June 2005 budget session.

On 17 August 2005, near-synchronized blasts of improvised explosive devices in 63 out of 64 administrative districts targeted mainly government buildings and killed two persons. An extremist Islamist group named Jamaat-ul-Mujahideen Bangladesh (JMB) claimed responsibility for the blasts, which aimed to press home JMB's demand for a replacement of the secular legal system with Islamic sharia courts. Subsequent attacks on the courts in several districts killed 28 people, including judges, lawyers, and police personnel guarding the courts. A government campaign against the Islamic extremists led to the arrest of hundreds of senior and mid-level JMB leaders. Six top JMB leaders were tried and sentenced to death for their role in the murder of two judges; another leader was tried and sentenced to death in absentia in the same case.

In February 2006, the AL returned to Parliament, demanded early elections and requested significant changes in the electoral and caretaker government systems to stop alleged moves by the ruling coalition to rig the next election. The AL blamed the BNP for several high-profile attacks on opposition leaders and asserted the BNP was bent on eliminating Sheikh Hasina and the Awami League as a viable force. The BNP and its allies accused the AL of maligning Bangladesh at home and abroad out of jealousy over the government's performance on development and economic issues. Dialogue between the Secretaries General of the main ruling and opposition parties failed to sort out the electoral reform issues.

Political crisis and Caretaker government, 2006–2008

The months preceding the planned 22 January 2007, elections were filled with political unrest and controversy. Following the end of Khaleda Zia's government in late October 2006, there were protests and strikes, during which 40 people were killed in the following month, over uncertainty about who would head the caretaker government. The caretaker government had difficulty bringing the all parties to the table. Awami League and its allies protested and alleged that the caretaker government favoured the BNP.

The interim period was marked by violence and strikes. Presidential Advisor Mukhlesur Rahman Chowdhury negotiated with Sheikh Hasina and Khaleda Zia and brought all the parties to the planned 22 January 2007 parliamentary elections. Later Hussain Muhammad Ershad's nomination was cancelled; as a result, the Grand Alliance withdrew its candidates en masse on the last day possible. They demanded to have voters' lists published.

Later in the month, the president Iajuddin Ahmed imposed a state of emergency. Iajuddin Ahmed resigned from the post of chief adviser, under the pressure of Bangladesh Army, and appointed Fakhruddin Ahmed, the new chief adviser. Political activity was prohibited.
The military-backed government worked to develop graft and corruption cases against leaders and members of both major parties. In March 2007, Khaleda Zia's two sons, who both had positions in Bangladesh Nationalist Party, were charged with corruption. Hasina was charged with graft and extortion in April 2007, and a day later, Khaleda Zia was charged with graft as well. There was attempt by Bangladesh Army chief Moeen U Ahmed, the head of Anti-Terrorism division of the Directorate General of Forces Intelligence Brigadier General ATM Amin, and Director of Directorate General of Forces Intelligence Brigadier General Chowdhury Fazlul Bari to remove Sheikh Hasina and Khaleda Zia from politics. Former Army Chief, General Hasan Mashhud Chowdhury, was made the head of Bangladesh Anti Corruption Commission. The Anti Corruption Commission and the Bangladesh Election Commission were strengthened by the caretaker government. On 27 August 2007 violence broke out in the University of Dhaka campus between students and soldiers of Bangladesh Army. Students called strikes and burned effigies of the army chief. Police attacked the students and physically assaulted Acting Vice-chancellor Prof AFM Yusuf Haider and other faculty members of the University of Dhaka. Students were joined in demonstration by street vendors and slum residents who were evicted by the government. Bangladesh Army agreed to the demands of the protesters and removed the Army camp from the University of Dhaka campus. Students and teachers expressed the continued state of emergency in Bangladesh.

Second Hasina administration

The Awami league won national election on 29 December 2008 as part of a larger electoral alliance that also included the Jatiya Party led by former military ruler General Hussain Muhammad Ershad as well as some leftist parties. According to the Official Results, Bangladesh Awami League won 230 out of 299 constituencies, and together with its allies, had a total of 262 parliamentary seats. The Awami League and its allies received 57% of the total votes cast. The AL alone got 48%, compared to 36% of the other major alliance led by the BNP which by itself got 33% of the votes. Sheikh Hasina, as party head, is the new Prime Minister. Her term of office began on 7 January 2009 after Fakhruddin Ahmed. The new cabinet had several new faces, including three women in prominent positions: Dr Dipu Moni (Foreign Minister), Matia Chowdhury (Agriculture Minister) and Sahara Khatun (Home Minister). Younger MPs with a link to assassinated members of the 1972–1975 AL government are Syed Ashraful Islam, son of Syed Nazrul Islam, Sheikh Fazle Noor Taposh, son of Sheikh Fazlul Huq Moni, and Tanjim Ahmad Sohel Taj, son of Tajuddin Ahmad.

Since 2009, the Awami League government faced several major political challenges, including BDR (border security force) mutiny, power crisis, unrest in garments industry and stock market fluctuations. Judicial achievements for the party included restoring 1972 constitution (set by the first Awami League government), beginning of war crimes trials, and guilty verdict in 1975 assassination trial. According to the Nielsen 2-year survey, 50% felt the country was moving in the right direction, and 36% gave the government a favourable rating.

Vision 2021 and Digital Bangladesh

Vision 2021  was the political manifesto of the Bangladesh Awami League party before winning the National Elections of 2008. It stands as a political vision of Bangladesh for the year 2021, the golden jubilee of the nation. The policy has been criticized as a policy emblematic of technological optimism in the context of Bangladesh and the state repression of media, low internet penetration, inadequate electricity generation. The Vision 2021 is an articulation of where this nation needs to be in 2021 – the year which marks the 50th anniversary of Bangladesh's independence.

Digital Bangladesh implies the broad use of computers, and embodies the modern philosophy of effective and useful use of technology in terms of implementing the promises in education, health, job placement and poverty reduction. The party underscored a changing attitude, positive thinking and innovative ideas for the successes of “Digital Bangladesh”.

2010s

War crimes tribunal

During the 2008 general election, the Awami League (AL) pledged to establish the tribunals in response to long-standing calls for trying war criminals. The first indictments were issued in 2010. However, the main perpetrators of the war crimes, the Pakistan soldiers, remained out of the reach of the courts.

The government set up the tribunal after the Awami League won the general election in December 2008 with a more than two-thirds majority in parliament. The War Crimes Fact Finding Committee, tasked to investigate and find evidence, completed its report in 2008, identifying 1,600 suspects. Prior to the formation of the ICT, the United Nations Development Programme offered assistance in 2009 on the tribunal's formation. In 2009, the parliament amended the 1973 act that authorised such a tribunal to update it.

Third Hasina administration, 2014–2019

General election were held in Bangladesh on 5 January 2014, in accordance with the constitutional requirement that the election must take place within the 90-day period before the expiration of the term of the Jatiyo Sangshad on 24 January 2014. The elections were controversial, with almost all major opposition parties boycotting and 154 of the total 300 seats being uncontested. Around 21 people were killed on polling day.

2014 Bangladesh anti-Hindu violence

On 5 January 2014, the 10th general elections were held in Bangladesh. The Opposition Bangladesh Nationalist Party and its ally Jamaat-e-Islami had already boycotted the elections. The buildup to the elections were marred by successive strikes and violence by the opposition parties. Victims claimed after the polls, workers and supporters of the opposition parties began attacking the minority Bengali Hindus. Accusing of looting, vandalising and setting the Hindu houses on fire in several districts across the country. Seven persons belonging to the Jamaat-e-Islami and the Bangladesh Nationalist Party were arrested in connection with the attacks. The National Human Rights Commission held the government responsible for the attacks on Hindus after the election.

Attacks on secularists
From 2013, a number of secularist writers, bloggers and publishers in Bangladesh have been killed or seriously injured in attacks perpetrated by Islamist extremists. The attacks have taken place at a time of growing tension between Bangladeshi secularists, who want the country to maintain its secularist tradition of separation of religion and state, and Islamists, who want an Islamic state. Tensions have also risen as a result of the country's war crimes tribunal, which has recently convicted several members of the opposition Islamist Jamaat-e-Islami party for crimes committed during Bangladesh's bloody war of independence in 1971. Secularists have been calling for harsher penalties for the convicted, with some calling for the Jamaat-e-Islam party itself to be outlawed, drawing the ire of the party's supporters. Responsibility for the attacks on secularists which have since occurred have been claimed by a number of militant groups including Ansarullah Bangla Team, who have frequently justified their attacks on the grounds that their victims are "atheists" and enemies of Islam. Four bloggers had been killed in 2015, but only 4 people were arrested in the murder cases.

Student protests against VAT on education
 

The 2015 Bangladesh student protests on "No VAT on Education" were protests by students of private universities in Bangladesh demanding the VAT imposed on higher education in private universities be eliminated.
The present Finance Minister of the Bangladesh Awami League government first introduced a 10% VAT upon higher education in private universities in the draft of budget of 2015–16. Following strong opposition, the VAT was reduced to 7.5%. The imposed VAT was withdrawn by the finance division after a cabinet meeting on 14 September 2015.

Quota Reform Movement 

The 2018 Bangladesh Quota Reform Movement is an ongoing students' movement demanding reforms in policies regarding recruitment in the Bangladesh government services. Bangladesh Sadharan Chhatra Adhikar Sangrakshan Parishad (Bangladesh General Students' Right Conservation Council) initiated movement initially began in Shahbag and on Dhaka University campus on 17 February 2018, and eventually spread country-wide by 8 April 2018. The movement rapidly attained popularity among students of different universities and colleges forcing the government to announce changes in its policy.

Road Safety Protests 

A series of public protests in Bangladesh advocating improved road safety were held from 29 July to 8 August 2018. They were sparked by the deaths of two high-school students in Dhaka struck by a bus operated by an unlicensed driver who was racing to collect passengers. The incident impelled students to demand safer roads and stricter traffic laws, and the demonstrations rapidly spread throughout Bangladesh.

The protests were peaceful until 2 August, when police attempted to disperse the demonstrators with tear gas and people believed to be members of a pro-government youth league attacked protesters and journalists. The government arrested several protesters and a photographer for giving an interview about the protests to international media. Various international organisations and high-profile figures expressed solidarity with the protesters. The crack-down on the student protesters received high criticism both domestically and internationally.

The third Sheikh Hasina Cabinet approved on 6 August a draft traffic act stipulating capital punishment for intentional killing and a maximum five-year prison sentence for accidental killing with a motor vehicle. The protesters felt that the maximum five-year sentence was too light for accidental deaths due to reckless driving. By 8 August, the situation in the city had returned to normal, most students had returned to their classes and traffic had resumed as normal, with many sources stating that the nine-day protests were over.

Fourth Hasina administration

2018 Bangladeshi general election were held on 30 December 2018. The result was a landslide victory for the Awami League led by Sheikh Hasina. The elections were marred by violence and claims of vote rigging. Opposition leader Kamal Hossain rejected the results, calling it "farcical" and demanding fresh elections to be held under a neutral government.

2020s

Mujib Year and Golden jubilee 

The government of Bangladesh has announced the commemoration of 2020-2021 as the Mujib Year on the occasion of the centennial birth anniversary of the founding leader of the country, Sheikh Mujibur Rahman . This year will be celebrated from 17 March 2020 to 26 March 2021. The UN General Assembly, UNESCO, has decided to jointly celebrate the Mujib Year with Bangladesh at the UNESCO 40th General Assembly. The decision was made in the presence of all UNESCO members on 12–27 November in Paris, held on 25 November 2019.

For the year 2021, the "Bangla50" initiative launched to celebrate 50 years of independence from Pakistan and is called in Bengali সুবর্ণ জয়ন্তী; Subarṇa jaẏantī, with a logo that spells "BD50". Several celebration programs will be held in countries including India, Russia, Germany, Sweden, Hungary, Poland, Nepal and Bhutan.

2021 Bangladesh communal violence 

From 13 to 19 October 2021, Muslim mobs instigated communal violence against Hindu communities across Bangladesh during the Durga Puja festival. More than 50 temples and makeshift worship arrangements were vandalized all over Bangladesh According to ASK aka Ain o Salish Kendra (আইন ও সালিশ কেন্দ্র) - a Bangladeshi legal aid and human rights organization; With 3,679 attacks in 9 years (between January 2013 and September 2021), Bangladesh’s Hindus at ‘regular threat’ of violence. 

The Bangladesh government deployed paramilitary Bangladesh Border Guards forces in 22 of the 64 administrative districts of Bangladesh to quell violence against the Hindu community. As of 22 October 2021, at least 11 people have been killed across the country, including 7 Hindus, in the "worst communal violence in years" as termed by The New York Times.

See also
 History of Bangladesh
 History of Bengal
 East Bengal
 East Pakistan

Footnotes

References
 
 CIA World Factbook (July 2005). Bangladesh

External links
 Rulers.org — Bangladesh List of rulers for Bangladesh

 
20th century in Bangladesh
21st century in Bangladesh
Bangladesh